Mad is a hard rock band from Buenos Aires, Argentina. They debuted in 1997.

Biography

Formed in 1996, the band consists of Tomy Casparri (lead vocals), Diego Castelli (bass), Julián Méndez Morgan (guitar), Pelusa Suffloni (guitar) and Rodrigo Chaparro (drums). With a "sound of powerful and overwhelming rock" they began by playing in the local underground rock scene.

They soon recorded their self-titled debut album 'MAD' which was released in 1998 and gained reasonable radio airplay having been well received by the critics.  They were subsequently invited to play in several rock festivals organised by Rock and Pop FM and recorded two songs for a 4K Records CD compilation.

In 2000 Mad was chosen by Eric Singer (former drummer of KISS) to support him for his KISS Exposition in Buenos Aires.  In the same year they were chosen to play twice in Mar Del Plata city and also in Buenos Aires as the headlining act at a music festival organised by the national beer, Quilmes.

In January 2001 Mad played to a crowd of 50,000 people in the Monsters Of Rock Festival opening for Iron Maiden, Rob Halford and Queens of the Stone Age at José Amalfitani Stadium.  They also appeared in several shows at the club Cemento, widely regarded as the "temple of Argentine rock" having hosted many famous bands in Argentine rock history such as Redonditos de Ricota, Las Pelotas and A.N.I.M.A.L.  The shows were excellently produced and during this time Mad were very much the "band of the moment".

In mid-2001 they entered the "El Pie" recording studio to record "En Llamas" (In Flames), their second album.  Produced by 4K Records/Sony Music the first single "Pajarito On The Rocks" soon became a big hit, for which a video was made.

In 2004 the guitarist Nicolas Barreiro jumped into the new lineup, and the band recorded its third album "Seguí La Flecha" (Follow The Arrow) produced by Adrián Taverna (Divididos, Attaque 77, Redonditos de Ricota, Soda Stereo, Riff, Gustavo Cerati).  From this album, several radio hits were born, like "La Rueda", "Imperdonable" and "El Postre", a song for which another music video was made starring Playboy Playmate Celina Rucci.

A special electric/acoustic "unplugged" style show was recorded in December 2005 and in 2007 was released as a live album.  They followed this show with a performance at the Cosquin Rock Festival held by San Roque lakeside in the province of Cordoba.

April 2006 was a turbulent time for the band losing two members.  Drummer Plato Caressa left by mutual agreement on friendly terms after he felt he could not commit himself fully to the band.  Replacement Vasco Urionagüena soon became accustomed to his role having acted as Plato's stand-in on previous occasions.

Lead singer Tomy Caspari was suddenly ejected from the band and they have issued no official statement as to the reason for his departure.

The band ceased performing for several months whilst they held auditions to find a suitable replacement for Tomy and eventually found an ideal frontman "El Gato" which initially caused some concern amongst the fans due in part to many suggesting he looks like English pop singer Robbie Williams, and may not have the hard-edged Brian Johnson style vocals that Tomy emulated.

Following some intensive practice sessions and a website re-launch the band has embarked on a string of gigs throughout Argentina and the new line-up has been well received by both the media and fans.

Discography

Mad
Produced in 1998 by David Urrutia.

01. Garra, Corazón y Huevos 	  			

02. Expreso Rock 	  			

03. El Boxeador 	  			

04. Gemidos De Amor 	  			

05. Mamá Está Presa 	  			

06. Gato De La Noche 	  			

07. Obsesionado (Por El R'n'R) 	  			

08. 'Cariciame El Mamú 	  			

09. El Pez Polera 	  			

10. Mal Parida

En Llamas
Produced in 2001 by Adrián Taverna
Quatro K Records / Sony Music Entertainment Argentina

01. Fierros Calientes 	  			  	  	  	  	

02. Noche De Rock 	  			  	  	  	  	

03. Pajarito On The Rocks 	  				  		  	

04. La Máquina De Amar 	  			  	  	  	  	

05. En Llamas 	  				  	  	  	

06. Rocío De Miel 	  			  	  	  	  	

07. Perro De Yeso 	  			  	  	  	  	

08. Nuestra Señora Del Metal 	  			  	  	  	  	

09. EMP 	  			  	  	  	  	

10. Pestañeá (Q.V.E.N.)

Seguí La Flecha
Produced in 2004 by Adrián Taverna
UMI Argentina

01. Siguen Golpeando  			  	  	

02. La Rueda 	  				  	

03. Electrorock 	  			  	  	

04. Humedecido 	  			  	  	

05. Mutaciones 	  			  	  	

06. Si Es Mujer Mejor 	  			  	  	

07. El Postre 	  				  	

08. Cuánto Hace Que No ? 	  			  	  	

09. Piquetero 	  			  	  	

10. Toro Viejo 	  			  	  	

11. Imperdonable 	  				  	

12. Bien Los Tres 	  			  	  	

13. Viaje De Ida

External links
Mad Official Website (in English & Spanish)
Rock.com.ar Biography (in Spanish)

Argentine rock music groups
Musical groups established in 1997